Gusztáv Juhász (also written as Guștav Iuhași; 19 December 1911 – 20 January 2003) was a Romanian football player and coach of Hungarian origin.

Biography

Player 
As a midfielder, he played for 18 seasons in the Romanian and Hungarian leagues, mostly in the towns of Oradea and Bucharest.

Romania 

With the Romania national football team, he was selected to play in the 1934 World Cup in Italy.

Coach 

After his career as a player, he became the coach of several clubs in the town of his birth.

Honours

Player
Venus București
 Liga I (1): 1939–40
Nagyváradi AC
 Nemzeti Bajnokság I (1): 1943–44

Coach
ITA Arad
 Cupa României (1): 1947–48

Notes and references 
 
 

1911 births
2003 deaths
Romanian sportspeople of Hungarian descent
Romania international footballers
Romanian football managers
Romanian footballers
1934 FIFA World Cup players
Sportspeople from Timișoara
Venus București players
Liga I players
Liga II players
CA Oradea players
FC Petrolul Ploiești players
FC UTA Arad managers
CA Oradea managers
FC Bihor Oradea managers
Association football midfielders